Tao Xingzhi (October 18, 1891 – July 25, 1946), was a renowned Chinese educator and reformer in the Republic of China mainland era. He studied at Teachers College, Columbia University, and returned to China to champion progressive education. His career in China as a liberal educator was not derivative of John Dewey, as some have alleged, but creative and adaptive. He returned to China at a time when the American influence was zesty and self-confident, and his very name at that time (zhixing) meant "knowledge-action," reflecting the catch-phrase of the Neo-Confucian philosopher Wang Yangming which implied that once knowledge (zhi) had been obtained, then action (xing) would be easy.

Biography 

Returning from study in the United States at University of Illinois and Columbia University, in 1917, he joined Nanking Higher Normal School and then National Southeastern University (later renamed National Central University and Nanking University), and he turned to "life education." He then also returned to his humble roots. "Originally," he wrote to his beloved younger sister, "I was a common Chinese, but gradually through ten years of life as a student, I developed a foreign, aristocratic tendency." Shanghai, the capital and center of modern/foreign China, he now found "vulgar, rushed, and crowded." Then "suddenly, like the Yellow River breaking its dikes..., I woke up [juewu, the Buddhist term for satori] to the fact that I was being robbed of my Chineseness." He took to wearing a traditional scholar's gown, and turned to mass education. He then reversed his name to the more well-known form, xingzhi, that is, "action-knowledge," directly implying that (Chinese) action/praxis will produce (Chinese) knowledge. He denounced "false intelligentsia" (wei zhishi jieji) for drawing on second hand, foreign experience of which they had no authentic knowledge.

In December 1921, Cai Yuanpei, Tao, and other educationists founded the National Association for the Advancement of Education (Zhong-Hua jiaoyu gaijin hui) and he was elected as secretary-general. Through the society the educationists promoted the forming of modern education system in China.

In August 1923, Tao and Y.C. James Yen organized the National Association of Mass Education Movements (MEM). At the height of its literacy campaign in the 1920s, Yen estimated that the MEM had taught five million students with more than 100,000 volunteer teachers. Tao went on to become the nation's leading promoter of rural teacher's education. In March 1927, Tao founded the Xiaozhuang Normal College in Nanjing to train teachers and educators, who were then sent to staff rural schools that Tao was establishing in rural China. This teacher's college produced a number of innovative techniques such as the "little teacher model", which encouraged pupils to teach their family what had they had just learned in school, and the "each one teach one" technique of organized teaching networks. The school was closed in 1930 by the Nationalist government for political reasons.

In the 1930s Tao wrote children's literature, started the Life Education Association, and started a Work Study Movement. He was in the United States when war with Japan broke out in 1937, but returned to China, where he was made a member of the People's Political Council. In 1939, he moved to Beibei, just outside Chongqing, to found the Chongqing Yucai Middle School (School for Nourishing Talent). Tao received  monthly stipends from Feng Yuxiang and Zhang Zhizhong, both fellow Anhui natives. A leader of one of the two CCP cells at Tao's school later recalled that Tao and his patron, Feng gave help to party workers when they were hunted by the secret police, and that Tao professed interest in Mao Zedong's "On New Democracy." One of the pupils at the school was Li Peng, the adopted son of Zhou Enlai and future premier of China.

In 1946, after the Yucai School was harassed by the political police, he moved back to Shanghai. Fearing that he would meet the same fate as other intellectuals assassinated by right wing Nationalists, he worked frantically, leading to exhaustion and death. Zhou Enlai rushed to his home and called him a "non-Party Bolshevik." Tao's reputation was high for the next few years, but in the early 1950s he came under attack as a "bourgeois liberal." In the 1980s, the "Tao Xingzhi Study Society" was founded by Song Enrong, who edited a multivolume edition of Tao's writings.

Nanjing Xiaozhuang Normal College
The Xiaozhuang Normal College, which Tao founded in 1927 and was closed due to political reasons in 1930, was reopened in 1951, after the founding of the People's Republic of China, by Wang Dazhi, one of Tao's students and an alumnus of the college. In 2000, the college became the Nanjing Xiaozhuang University.

See also
 Memorial of Tao Xingzhi

Notes

References

Further reading
 "T'ao Hsing-chih," in Howard Boorman, ed., Biographical Dictionary of Republican China (New York: Columbia University Press, 1970) III.243–248.
 Stacey Bieler, "Patriots" or "Traitors"? A History of American-Educated Chinese Students (Armonk, NY: M.E. Sharpe, 2004).
 Yusheng Yao, "Rediscovering Tao Xingzhi as an Educational and Social Revolutionary," Twentieth Century China 27.2 (April 2002): 79–120.
 Yusheng Yao, "The Making of a National Hero: Tao Xingzhi's Legacies in the People's Republic of China," Review of Education, Pedagogy, and Cultural Studies 24.2 (July–September 2002): 251–281.

External links 

 

1891 births
1946 deaths
Educators from Anhui
Academic staff of the National Central University
Academic staff of Nanjing University
Academic staff of Nanjing Normal University
People from Huangshan
Teachers College, Columbia University alumni